British singer-songwriter from Brighton, Nick Howard has released two studio albums, two extended play, one compilation and two singles. In 2012 he won the second season of The Voice of Germany.

His debut album, Something To Talk About was released on 7 May 2008 under Honey Factor Records. The album included songs which were featured in television shows and films, and received airplay across radio networks in the US and in Europe.

His second album, When The Lights Go Up was released on 31 October 2011 under Honey Factor Records. The album included several tracks produced by Marshall Altman, and was recorded in Los Angeles and Nashville. The first singles from the album have broken into radio charts and MTV played the video for "Falling For You". To support the release of this album, Howard supported Lifehouse, Boyce Avenue, Tyler Ward and Sunrise Avenue, and has undertaken tours of his own in 2012. He was the recipient of an ASCAP songwriting award for "Days Like These", a single from the new album.

Before Howard won The Voice of Germany he released his winners single "Unbreakable" on 7 December 2012 as the lead single from his third studio album, the single peaked at number 5 on the German Singles Chart. On 21 December 2012 he released My Voice Story a compilation album of all the songs he performed on the show, peaking at number 34 on the German Albums Chart.

Albums

Studio albums

Compilation albums

Extended plays

Singles

As lead artist

Other charted songs

References

External links
Official website
Facebook
Twitter

Pop music group discographies